Chrysonasma caliginosa is a moth in the family Lecithoceridae. It is found on Palawan island of the Philippines.

The wingspan is 15–16 mm. The forewings are elongate with a light orange to greyish orange ground color. There are three shining metallic blue, longitudinal streaks on the basal part of the wing.

References

Moths described in 2008
Torodorinae